The canton of Vallet is an administrative division of the Loire-Atlantique department, western France. Its borders were modified at the French canton reorganisation which came into effect in March 2015. Its seat is in Vallet.

It consists of the following communes:
 
La Boissière-du-Doré
La Chapelle-Heulin
Divatte-sur-Loire
Le Landreau
Le Loroux-Bottereau
Mouzillon
Le Pallet
La Regrippière
La Remaudière
Saint-Julien-de-Concelles
Vallet

References

Cantons of Loire-Atlantique